This list is of the Cultural Properties of Japan designated in the categories of  and  for the Prefecture of Ehime.

National Cultural Properties

Calligraphic works and classical texts
As of 1 July 2015, three Important Cultural Properties have been designated, being of national significance.

Ancient documents
As of 1 July 2015, three Important Cultural Properties have been designated.

Prefectural Cultural Properties
As of 27 March 2015, eleven properties have been designated at a prefectural level.

See also
 Cultural Property (Japan)
 List of National Treasures of Japan (writings: Chinese books)
 List of National Treasures of Japan (writings: Japanese books)
 List of National Treasures of Japan (writings: others)
 List of National Treasures of Japan (ancient documents)

References

External links
  Cultural Properties in Ehime Prefecture

Cultural Properties,Writings
Writings,Ehime